Eric William Chomba (born 11 June 1988) is a Zambian football midfielder who currently plays for Nkwazi F.C.

References

1988 births
Living people
Zambian footballers
Zambia international footballers
Konkola Blades F.C. players
Nkwazi F.C. players
Association football midfielders